Kenneth Ivo Brownley Langwell Mackenzie (25 September 1913 – 19 January 1955) was an Australian poet and novelist.  His first and best-known novel, The Young Desire It (1937), was published under the pen name Seaforth Mackenzie.

Life
Mackenzie was born in South Perth. He grew up in Pinjarra, Western Australia, and attended Guildford Grammar School.  His experiences at Guildford in part inspired his novel of 1937 The Young Desire It. His novel Dead Men Rising was about the Cowra breakout of which he had first hand experience, having been stationed there at the time of the event.

He married Kate Bartlett (nee Loveday), in 1935.  Their daughter Elizabeth was born in 1936, and son Hugh was born in 1938.

His life in Sydney included involvement with the world of Norman Lindsay and Hugh McCrae and archival records show significant influence from them.

He received a number of literary grants and awards, and left a number of works which have been since edited and published.

In his later years he was separated from his wife who had moved into Sydney, while he lived in limited conditions in Kurrajong.
He died by accidental drowning in Tallong Creek near Goulburn, New South Wales, aged 41.

Most of his works were originally published during his lifetime, however, some material has been reprinted by Text Publishing.

Writing

Novels

As Seaforth Mackenzie
The Young Desire It, London, Cape (1937)
Chosen People, London, Cape (1938)
Dead Men Rising, London, Cape (1951)
The Refuge, London, Cape (1954)

Poetry
Our Earth, Sydney, Angus and Robertson (1937)
The Moonlit Doorway, Sydney, Angus and Robertson (1944)
Selected Poems (1961)
The poems of Kenneth MacKenzie (1972)

As editor
 Australian poetry, 1951-2 (selected by Kenneth Mackenzie), Sydney : Angus & Robertson (1952)

Posthumous collection
 Rossiter, Richard (2000)   The Model

Biographical material
 Davis, D (1965) Bibliography
 Davis, D (1967) Thesis about MacKenzie
 Jones, Evan (1969) Kenneth Mackenzie: Australian Writers and their Work Melbourne: Oxford University Press.
 Kinross-Smith, Graeme (1980) Australian Writers Melbourne: Thomas Nelson.

Notes

External links
 

1913 births
1955 deaths
20th-century Australian novelists
20th-century Australian poets
Australian male poets
Australian male novelists
People from Pinjarra, Western Australia
People educated at Guildford Grammar School
ALS Gold Medal winners
Writers from Western Australia
20th-century Australian male writers
Deaths by drowning in Australia
Accidental deaths in New South Wales